The 1970 Campeonato Paulista da Divisão Especial de Futebol Profissional, organized by the Federação Paulista de Futebol, was the 69th season of São Paulo's top professional football league. São Paulo won the title for the 9th time. no teams were relegated and the top scorer was São Paulo's Toninho Guerreiro with 13 goals.

Championship
In that year, a new format was introduced: a preliminary phase was to be disputed before the championship proper, in which the teams played against each other twice and the five best teams qualified into the main championship. That phase was to be disputed in the first semester of 1970, by all the teams except for the "big five": Corinthians, Palmeiras, Portuguesa, São Paulo and Santos, who received a direct bye into the championship proper.

In the championship proper, each team played against the others twice, and the team with the most points won the title.

Preliminary phase

At the end of the preliminary phase, Paulista, Ponte Preta and São Bento ended up tied in points and had to dispute a playoff to define the two teams that would qualify to the Main championship. Paulista played its matches first and lost both of them, making the third match between Ponte Preta and São Bento unnecessary.

Championship proper

Top Scores

SReferences

Campeonato Paulista seasons
Paulista